Gary Vaynerchuk (born Gennady Vaynerchuk; November 14, 1975;), commonly known as Gary Vee, is a Soviet-born American entrepreneur, author, speaker, and Internet personality. He is a co-founder of the restaurant reservation software company Resy and Empathy Wines. First known as a wine critic who expanded his family's wine business, Vaynerchuk is now more known for his work in digital marketing and social media as the chairman of New York-based communications company VaynerX, and as CEO of VaynerX subsidiary VaynerMedia.

Early life 
Vaynerchuk was born in Babruysk in the Soviet Union (today part of Belarus), and immigrated to New York City in the United States in 1978 at the age of three. He is of Ashkenazi Jewish descent. Growing up, Vaynerchuk lived in New York City's Queens borough and later moved to Edison, New Jersey. At age 14, he joined his family's retail-wine business. After his family moved, he graduated from North Hunterdon High School. In 1998, Vaynerchuk graduated with a bachelor's degree in management science from Mount Ida College in Newton, Massachusetts.

Career 
Vaynerchuk co-founded restaurant-reservation app Resy, which was acquired by American Express in 2019. He is also a co-founder of winery Empathy Wines, which was acquired by Constellation Brands in 2020.  Vaynerchuk is the creator and founder behind the VeeFriends1 and VeeFriends2 non-fungible token series.

Wine Library 
After graduating from college in 1998, Vaynerchuk took charge of his father's liquor store, Shopper's Discount Liquors. He renamed the store Wine Library, launched sales online, and in 2006 started Wine Library TV, a daily webcast on YouTube covering wine. He grew the business from $3 million a year to $60 million a year. In August 2011, Vaynerchuk stepped away from the wine business to build VaynerMedia, a digital ad agency.

VaynerX 
Vaynerchuk is the chairman of VaynerX, a communications company that holds media properties and technology companies.

VaynerMedia 

In 2009, Vaynerchuk, along with his brother AJ Vaynerchuk, founded VaynerMedia, a social media–focused digital agency. The company provides social media and strategy services to Fortune 500 companies. In 2015, VaynerMedia was named one of Ad Age's A-List agencies. With 600 employees in 2016, VaynerMedia grossed $100 million in revenue. The company also partnered with Vimeo to connect brands and filmmakers for digital content.

Gallery Media Group 
In 2017, Vaynerchuk formed The Gallery, later renamed Gallery Media Group, a VaynerX subsidiary company that houses PureWow, male-oriented news outlet ONE37pm.com, and other media properties.

Media

Planet of the Apps 
In February 2017, Vaynerchuk was a participant of Planet of the Apps, a reality television series, with will.i.am and Gwyneth Paltrow. In the show, Vaynerchuk and the team evaluated pitches from app developers vying for investment.

YouTube shows and videos 
Vaynerchuk hosted a video blog on YouTube called Wine Library TV (WLTV or The Thunder Show) from 2006 to 2011, featuring wine reviews, tastings, and wine advice. The show debuted in February 2006. At 1,000 episodes in 2011, Vaynerchuk retired the show and replaced it with a video podcast called The Daily Grape.

In 2010, Vaynerchuk launched Wine & Web on Sirius XM satellite radio. The show's programming paired new wine tastings in a "Wine of the Week" segment with coverage of gadgets, trends and startups in its "Web of the Week" segment.

In 2014, Vaynerchuk launched The #AskGaryVee Show on YouTube in which he responds to questions from Twitter and Instagram. The questions are mostly on entrepreneurship, family and business topics. The show inspired Vaynerchuk's fourth book, AskGaryVee: One Entrepreneur's Take on Leadership, Social Media, and Self-Awareness which reached The New York Times Best Seller list.

DailyVee is a daily, video-documentary series on YouTube hosted by Vaynerchuk. Started in 2015, he records interviews with other businessmen and broadcasts investor meetings and strategy sessions at VaynerMedia.

Reception 

Vaynerchuk has earned a social-media following around mentorship. However, critics have called him a snake oil salesman.

In 2015, Vaynerchuk was named to Crain's New York Business 40 Under 40. In 2017, Vaynerchuk was listed as one of Forbes' Top Social Influencers.

Works 
 Gary Vaynerchuk's 101 Wines: Guaranteed to Inspire, Delight, and Bring Thunder to Your World (2008) 
 Crush It!: Why NOW Is the Time to Cash In on Your Passion (2009) 
 The Thank You Economy (2011) 
 Jab, Jab, Jab Right Hook (2013) 
 #AskGaryVee: One Entrepreneur's Take on Leadership, Social Media, and Self-Awareness Hardcover (2016) 
 Crushing It! How Great Entrepreneurs Build Their Business and Influence—and How You Can, Too (2018) 
 Twelve and a Half: Leveraging the Emotional Ingredients Necessary for Business Success (2021)

References

External links 

 

1975 births
20th-century Belarusian Jews
21st-century Belarusian Jews
Living people
People from Edison, New Jersey
Wine critics
American people of Belarusian-Jewish descent
Revision3
American business executives
American technology company founders
American media personalities
American podcasters
American bloggers
American Internet celebrities
Technology evangelists
American motivational writers
American television personalities
American investors
North Hunterdon High School alumni
21st-century American non-fiction writers
Mount Ida College alumni